Graeme Bean (24 April 1948 – 5 October 1993) was an Australian rules footballer who played with Footscray in the Victorian Football League (VFL).

Notes

External links 
		

1948 births
1993 deaths
Australian rules footballers from Victoria (Australia)
Western Bulldogs players